Ricardo Vantes (born 21 April 1967) is a Cuban former indoor volleyball player. He competed in the men's tournament at the 1996 Summer Olympics. where Cuba finished in 6th place.

References

External links
 

1967 births
Living people
Cuban men's volleyball players
Olympic volleyball players of Cuba
Volleyball players at the 1996 Summer Olympics
Place of birth missing (living people)
Pan American Games medalists in volleyball
Pan American Games gold medalists for Cuba
Medalists at the 1991 Pan American Games